Livestorm is a software company that provides a browser based online web conferencing software for webinars and virtual meetings.

History 

Livestorm was founded in Paris, France in 2016 by Gilles Bertaux, Robin Lambert, Tom Forlini and Vincent Garreau. The company originated as a final-year project for HETIC business school. Then called Rumble, the project was later renamed as Livestorm.

In 2019, Livestorm raised a 4.6 million euros series A from public investment bank BPI France, Aglaé Ventures and Raise Ventures.

In February 2020, the Covid-19 pandemic resulted in more companies working remotely, which positively impacted Livestorm's growth. The product usage grew by 30 and its revenue was multiplied by 7.

In November 2020, Livestorm raised a $30 million series B.

In 2021, Livestorm was named among the fastest growing European companies by the Financial Times.

Technology 

Livestorm's core is focused on leveraging WebRTC and WebSocket for real time, low-latency interactions. The video stream quality and format automatically adapts to each viewers' web browser. The stream serves a WebRTC stream for compatible browsers including Google Chrome, Firefox and Opera, with a fall back on HLS on Internet Explorer and Safari.

The frontend runs on the Vue.js framework.

Products 

Livestorm provides a video conferencing software for webinars and virtual meetings, with tools for registration pages, email cadences and analytics. A public API service was launched in 2021.

See also
 Comparison of web conferencing software
 Web conferencing
 Collaborative software

References

External links
 Livestorm website

Communication software
Web conferencing